"Southern Cross" is a song written by Stephen Stills, Rick Curtis, and Michael Curtis and performed by the rock band Crosby, Stills & Nash. It was featured on the band's Daylight Again album and was released as a single in September 1982. Stephen Stills sings lead throughout, with Graham Nash joining on the second verse. Because David Crosby did not reunite with Stills and Nash until the album was well underway, his vocals are not featured on the album version, although he did appear in the video and subsequently sang the song with the group in live performances. The single was a success on the charts, reaching No. 18 on the Billboard Hot 100 for three weeks in late November and early December 1982.  As of 2022, it was the group's final hit in the Billboard Top 40.

Composition and music
"Southern Cross" is based on the song "Seven League Boots" by Rick and Michael Curtis. Stills explained, "The Curtis Brothers brought a wonderful song called 'Seven League Boots,' but it drifted around too much. I rewrote a new set of words and added a different chorus, a story about a long boat trip I took after my divorce. It's about using the power of the universe to heal your wounds. Once again, I was given somebody's gem and cut and polished it."

The song title and lyrics reference the Crux constellation, known as the Southern Cross.

Billboard called the song a "midtempo minor-keyed saga very much in the tradition of [Stills'] earlier CSN and solo compositions."

Video
The video for the song, which got heavy play during the early years of the MTV and VH1 cable networks, featured Stephen Stills sailing a large boat (called Southern Cross), intercut with images of the band singing, including David Crosby although he did not sing on the song (see above).

Personnel
 Stephen Stills – vocals, guitars
 Graham Nash – vocals

Additional musicians
 Timothy B. Schmit – vocals
 Michael Stergis – guitars
 Mike Finnigan – keyboards, backing vocals
 Richard T. Bear – keyboards
 George "Chocolate" Perry – bass
 Joe Vitale – drums
 Joe Lala – percussion

Cover versions
"Southern Cross" has also been covered by:
 Jimmy Buffett, whose version first appeared on the Live album, Buffett Live: Tuesdays, Thursdays, Saturdays; the song became a staple at many of Buffett's concerts and corresponding live releases
 British artist Dave Mason
 Pat McGee, on his debut album From the Wood
Sludge metal band Weedeater, on their debut album ...And Justice for Y'all
Canadian singer Roch Voisine, on his cover compilation Americana 3

Locations
The song mentions a number of locations that one may visit on a sailing voyage from Southern California to the South Pacific, following the "Coconut Milk Run". In order of appearance in the song (and in reverse order of the narrating sailor's southwestward journey), they are:
Southern islands - referring to Polynesia
Papeete - the capital of French Polynesia on the island of Tahiti
Marquesas - a group of volcanic islands in French Polynesia, northeast of Tahiti
Avalon - a harbor town on Santa Catalina Island, just off the coast of Los Angeles, California.

See also
 Sailors' superstitions

References

External links
 Crosby Stills and Nash official website
 YouTube Video of a live performance

Crosby, Stills, Nash & Young songs
1982 songs
Songs about boats
Songs about oceans and seas
Songs written by Stephen Stills
Atlantic Records singles